Ella Bogdanova (born 11 July 1996) is a Ukrainian female acrobatic gymnast. With partner Anastasiia Veresova, Bogdanova achieved 6th in the 2014 Acrobatic Gymnastics World Championships.

References

1996 births
Living people
Ukrainian acrobatic gymnasts
Female acrobatic gymnasts
21st-century Ukrainian women